Michael Dragan Curcija (Serbian: Мајкл Драган Ћурчија, Majkl Dragan Ćurčija; born 27 June 1977 in Melbourne) is a retired Australian football striker.

Club career
Curcija's first taste of senior football came in the lower levels of the Victorian State League, where as a 16-year-old, he made his debut for Diamond Valley United, scoring in three matches before securing a move to Heidelberg United in the National Soccer League. Curcija made his NSL debut in a 1–0 home loss to Adelaide City in 1994. Another substitute appearance followed before he transferred to rivals South Melbourne the following season.

It was at South Melbourne that Curcija established himself as one of Australia's most prolific young strikers. He helped the club to successive championships in 1998 and 1999, and scored a personal best of 19 goals in the 1999–2000 season. His career highlight for South Melbourne was representing the club in the 2000 FIFA Club World Championship in Brazil.

At the age of 23, Curcija secured a dream move to Serbian giants FK Partizan, but he struggled to settle or win a first team spot, and after three months, moved to Portugal where he signed a contract with the ambitious SC Braga in the Portuguese Liga. His first season was restricted to bench appearances as the club finished fourth, but he secured his first starts with the senior squad along with his debut goal the following year. However, throughout his time at the club, he was largely a feature of the club's reserves team who competed in the Portuguese Third Tier.

Curcija ultimately returned to South Melbourne for what was the final NSL season in 2003–04, picking up where he left off in domestic football, scoring 13 goals in 25 appearances. With the league disbanded, Curcija returned to the Victorian Premier League, playing with Essendon Royals in 2004, where he scored at better than a goal a game. His form in 2005 was just as impressive, playing every match of the season for 15 goals.

Despite his pedigree, he failed to land a contract in the inaugural A-League season, and signed for newly promoted Kingston City in 2006, where another prolific season followed. In 2007, he transferred to Altona Magic, playing in successive championships in 2008 and 2009, before moving to Oakleigh Cannons for the 2010 season.

International career
Having established himself as a first team regular for South Melbourne in the National Soccer League, Curcija was selected by Les Scheinflug in the Oceania Qualifying tournament for the 1997 FIFA World Youth Championship. He scored a brace in his first match against Fiji, and featured against New Zealand in the group phase and final. The finals were staged in Malaysia, and featured several players who would go on to become senior Socceroos, including Brett Emerton, Lucas Neill, Vince Grella and Mark Bresciano. Curcija featured in all of Australia's matches in the tournament, but failed to trouble the score sheet.

Curcija's performances at Under 20 level were rewarded with selection in the Olyroos squad for the 2000 Summer Olympics which were staged in Sydney, Australia. Raul Blanco played him in a striking role alongside Mark Viduka in all of Australia's matches against Italy, Nigeria and Honduras, but he did not score as the Olyroos failed to progress beyond the group phase.

He earned his first Socceroos cap under Frank Farina later that year in an away friendly against Kuwait, coming on as a substitute for goalscorer John Aloisi in the 60th minute. He replaced Aloisi again three days later in a match against South Korea, which the Socceroos lost 4–2 after blowing a 2–0 lead. Despite playing in a top European league at the time, he failed to impress the national selectors, and these matches remain his only full international caps.

References

External links
 OzFootball profile
 
 

1977 births
Living people
Australian people of Serbian descent
Australian soccer players
Association football forwards
Australia international soccer players
Footballers at the 2000 Summer Olympics
Olympic soccer players of Australia
South Melbourne FC players
FK Partizan players
Primeira Liga players
S.C. Braga players
Segunda Divisão players
S.C. Braga B players
Australian expatriate soccer players
Expatriate footballers in Serbia and Montenegro
Expatriate footballers in Portugal
Australian Institute of Sport soccer players
Australian expatriate sportspeople in Serbia and Montenegro
Australian expatriate sportspeople in Portugal
Australia youth international soccer players
Soccer players from Melbourne